Nisaxis tomentosa is a species of ant-loving beetle in the family Staphylinidae. It is found in the Caribbean Sea, North America, and South America.

References

Further reading

 

Pselaphinae
Articles created by Qbugbot
Beetles described in 1833
Beetles of North America
Beetles of South America